Zinc arsenide (Zn3As2) is a binary compound of zinc with arsenic which forms gray tetragonal crystals. It is an inorganic semiconductor with a band gap of 1.0 eV.

Synthesis and reactions
Zinc arsenide can be prepared by the reaction of zinc with arsenic
3 Zn  +  2 As   →   Zn3As2

Structure
Zn3As2 has a room-temperature tetragonal form that converts to a different tetragonal phase at 190 °C and to a third phase at 651 °C. In the room-temperature form, the zinc atoms are tetrahedrally coordinated and the arsenic atoms are surrounded by six zinc atoms at the vertices of a distorted cube. The crystalline structure of zinc arsenide is very similar to that of cadmium arsenide (Cd3As2), zinc phosphide (Zn3P2) and cadmium phosphide (Cd3P2). These compounds of the Zn-Cd-P-As quaternary system exhibit full continuous solid-solution.

Electronic structure 
Its lowest direct and indirect bandgaps are within 30 meV or each other.

References

arsenide
zinc
II-V semiconductors
II-V compounds
Soviet chemical weapons program